Molly World is a commercial mixtape by American rapper Robb Banks. It was released on March 9, 2018, by SS Records and Empire Distribution. The mixtape features guest appearances from Chief Keef, Birdman, Zoey Dollaz, Famous Dex and Lil Gnar. It was produced by INDIGOCHILDRICK, Richie Souf, Nuri and Cris Dinero, among others.

Background
Banks spoke about the project on Noisey.

Singles 
The first single, "ILYSM" featuring Famous Dex, was released on November 30, 2017. The song was produced by Natra Average. The track was originally teased by Bank$ with a 60-second snippet in EP "Cloverfield 2.0". Its music video was released on January 11, 2018.

On March 1, 2018, Bank$ released promotional single "Ride Wit Me" featuring Chief Keef. The song was produced by Nuri.

Track listing

References

2018 mixtape albums
Empire Distribution albums
Robb Banks albums